Hare Kanch Ki Chooriyan (Green Glass Bangles) is a 1967 Hindi, social family drama film, produced and directed by Kishore Sahu. The story, screenplay and dialogue were written by Kishore Sahu. Shankar Jaikishan composed the music while the lyrics were written by Hasrat Jaipuri and Shailendra. Sahu presented his daughter Naina Sahu, in her debut acting role, as the main character. The film starred Biswajeet, Naina Sahu, Shiv Kumar, Nazir Hussain, Rajendranath, Helen and Lalita Pawar.

The story revolves around a young medical student Mohini (Naina Sahu), whose life changes radically when she becomes pregnant. Shunned by society and friends the film focuses on her determination to face society as an unwed mother.

Plot
Mohini (Naina Sahu) is a medical student, and lives at home with her father Kishenlal Saxena (Nazir Hussain), a college Professor, and her ailing mother. Her neighbours are Bipin (Shiv Kumar) and his parents. Bipin and his friends have just returned to their town from Bombay after completing their studies. One of Bipin's friends, Ravi Mehra (Biswajeet), is the son of a wealthy businessman, Amarchand Mehra (Sapru). Ravi and Mohini meet and fall in love. Bipin also loves Mohini but has never expressed his feelings. When Ravi leaves to go abroad for further studies, he promises he will get green bangles for her, as a symbol of marriage. However, soon after he leaves, Mohini is told by their family doctor that she is pregnant. Vilified and expelled from college, her father is her only support especially since her mother dies soon after hearing the news.

Ravi's father is against Mohini and Ravi's marriage, and he creates situations where Ravi is unable to return to India for another year and a half. Mehra also insults the Professor and his daughter when they come to inform him of Mohini's pregnancy. Bipin comes forward and offers to marry Mohini, but she refuses saying she will wait for Ravi. However, instead of returning home as planned, Ravi goes to the US with his father. An angry Mohini refuses to acknowledge his letters, intending to face the situation alone.  Bipin's mother Maya (Lalita Pawar), is at first horrified but soon comes round when her husband (S. N. Bannerjee) talks to her about Mohini's predicament.  Maya then starts helping Mohini, first with her pregnancy and then in taking care of the infant. With Maya's acceptance, the other town people also start accepting Mohini. Ravi returns from the US, but his father creates further misunderstanding when he lies to him about Mohini giving birth to Bipin's child. Ravi's father arranges his marriage with his associate's daughter, Pushpa (Helen), who is keen to marry Ravi. During the marriage procession Ravi meets up with his child and Mohini. They clear up their misunderstandings created by his father, and preparations for Ravi and Mohini's wedding begin with the blessings Ravi's mother.

Cast
 Biswajeet as Ravi Kumar Mehra
 Naina Sahu as Mohini
 Shiv Kumar s Dr. Bipin Bose
 Rajendranath as Jimmy
 Helen as Pushpa Malhotra
 Nazir Hussain as Prof. Kishanlal Saxena
 Achala Sachdev as Radha Saxena
 Sapru as Amarchand Mehra
 Mridula Rani as Mrs. Kamla Mehra
 S. N. Banerjee as Bipin’s father
 Asrani as Tripathi, college friend
 Meena T.
 Jankidas as storekeeper
 Brahm Bhardwaj as Dr. Dixit
 Vikram Sahu
 Tun Tun

Crew
The film crew consisted of:
 Producer: Kishore Sahu
 Director: Kishore Sahu
 Associate producers: Preeti Sahu, Rohit Sahu
 Cinematography: K. H. Kapadia
 Special Effects: Parduman Randhawa
 Editing: Kantilal B. Shukla
 Art Direction and set decoration: Sant Singh
 Make-up: P.G/ Joshi, Prem Kumar
 Music: Shanker Jaikishan
 Lyrics: Hasrat Jaipuri and Shailendra
 Song Recordist: Minoo Katrak
 Choreographer: P. L. Raj

Soundtrack
Two of the popular songs were "Baj Uthengi Hare Kaanch Ki Chooriyan" sung by Asha Bhosle, and "Panchhi Re" sung by Mohammed Rafi and Asha Bhosle. The music composers were Shankar Jaikishan and the lyricists were Hasrat Jaipuri and Shailendra. The other singer in the film was Sharda, a Shankar protégé, who sang three of the six songs.

Songs

References

External links

1967 films
1960s Hindi-language films
Films directed by Kishore Sahu
Films scored by Shankar–Jaikishan
Films about women in India